Static/Crash is the debut album of Canadian indie rock band The Mark Inside.  After its initial release in 2004, it was remastered by Ian Blurton and re-released on MapleMusic in 2005.

Track listing 
All music by The Mark Inside (Geoff Bennett, Geordie Dynes, Gus Harris, Chris Levoir); lyrics by Chris Levoir.

 "Carousel" – 2:42
 "Sweet Little Sister" – 4:37
 "Coming Back Under Attack" – 3:21
 "Life on the Atlas" – 3:22
 "Metal Monsters" – 4:10
 "Dead Already" – 5:55
 "Inside: These Apparent Things" – 4:52
 "Everybody Talks About Everybody Else" – 3:17
 "The Deeper I Go" – 4:30
 "Paradise" – 3:55
 "Screaming; Drowning; Haunting" – 7:04
 "Buzzing" – 3:09

Personnel 
 Geoff Bennett – bass, guitar, bull horn feedback, vocals
 Geordie Dynes – drums, keyboard, bongos, blown bottle, vocals
 Gus Harris – guitar, bass, ARP, vocals
 Chris Levoir - vocals, guitar, tambourine, chains

Technical personnel 
The band produced tracks 3, 6, 8, 10, and 11.

 Thom D'Arcy – engineering and producer (tracks 1, 2, 4, 5, 7, 9, 12)
 Azra Hussain, Kyle Kotyk, Jeremy Vincent – engineering (tracks 3, 6, 8, 10, 11)
 Matt de Matteo – mixing (track 1)
 Steve Krecklo, Andreas Tompros – mixing (tracks 2–12)
 Brett Zilahi – mastering
 Ian Blurton (2005 edition only) – engineering and producer (track 2), mixing tracks 2, 3, 6–12

2004 debut albums